Cuthbert Winfred Pound (June 20, 1864 – February 3, 1935, Ithaca, Tompkins County, New York) was an American lawyer and politician from New York. He was Chief Judge of the New York Court of Appeals from 1932 to 1934.

Life
He was born on June 20, 1864, in Lockport, Niagara County, New York, the son of Alexander Pound and Almina (Whipple) Pound. He was educated at Lockport High School; and graduated from Cornell Law School in 1887. While a student, Pound was a member of the Delta Kappa Epsilon fraternity.  He studied law in the office of his brother John Pound (died 1904), was admitted to the bar in 1886, and practiced law in Lockport in partnership with his brother.

 Pound was a Republican member of the New York State Senate (29th D.) in 1894 and 1895. Afterwards he moved to Ithaca, New York and became a Law Professor at Cornell from 1895 to 1904.

In June 1900, he was appointed by Governor Theodore Roosevelt to the New York State Civil Service Commission, and remained in office until 1904. In 1903, his 11-year-old son Cuthbert W. Pound Jr. shot himself dead accidentally with a Flobert rifle.

Governor Frank W. Higgins chose Pound as Legal Adviser to the Governor, to take office on January 1, 1905, and in May 1906, appointed him to the New York Supreme Court, to fill the vacancy caused by the death of Henry A. Childs. In November 1906, Pound was elected to a 14-year term to succeed himself.

On August 3, 1915, he was designated a judge of the New York Court of Appeals under the Amendment of 1899 to replace Nathan Lewis Miller who had resigned. In November 1916, he was elected on the Republican and Progressive tickets to a 14-year term on the Court of Appeals, and was re-elected in 1930. On March 8, 1932, he was appointed by Governor Franklin D. Roosevelt as Chief Judge to succeed Benjamin N. Cardozo who had been appointed to the United States Supreme Court. In November 1932, he was elected to succeed himself, and retired from the bench at the end of 1934 when he reached the constitutional age limit of 70 years.

He was member of the Board of Trustees of Cornell University from 1913 until his death.

He died on February 3, 1935, in Ithaca; and was buried at the Cold Springs Cemetery in Lockport.

References

Sources
 Appointed to the Civil Service Commission, in NYT on June 12, 1900
 His son's death, in NYT on June 5, 1903
 Appointed Counsel to the Governor, in NYT on December 22, 1904
 Appointed to NY Supreme Court, in NYT on May 29, 1906
 Appointed to the Court of Appeals, in NYT on August 4, 1915 (Note: "Designation" is an appointment which does not require confirmation by the State Senate)
 Election result in NYT on November 9, 1916
 Appointed Chief Judge, in NYT on March 9, 1932
 Listing of Court of Appeals judges, with portrait
 Portrait with link to biography
10,000 Famous Freemasons from K to Z by William R. Denslow & Harry S. Truman, Kessinger Publishing, 2004,  ; page 360)
Great American Judges: An Encyclopedia by John R. Vile (ABC-CLIO, 2003, ; page 630)

|-

1864 births
1935 deaths
Chief Judges of the New York Court of Appeals
Cornell University alumni
New York (state) Progressives (1912)
20th-century American politicians
Republican Party New York (state) state senators
New York Supreme Court Justices
Politicians from Ithaca, New York
Politicians from Lockport, New York